Vaccinium formosum, with common names highbush blueberry, southern blueberry, southern highbush blueberry, and swamp highbush blueberry, is a species of blueberry that is native to the Southeastern United States.

Description 
Vaccinium formosum is a deciduous shrub that grows to approximately 3.96-4.57 m (13–15 ft) tall. The plant has ovaloid green leaves that are about 2.5-7.6 cm (1–3 in) in length.

The flowers of the Vaccinium formosum bloom whitish-pink in a bell shape, and the fruit is a dark blue with a "glaucous bloom". The plant has green stems that turn into woody growth as the stems age.

Vaccinium formosum berries are edible in both raw and cooked forms.

Distribution and habitat 
Vaccinium formosum is native to the Southeastern United States. It has been found in Alabama, Florida, Georgia, South Carolina, North Carolina, Virginia, Washington, D.C., Maryland, Delaware, and New York. It grows in a variety of habitats including bogs, pine barrens, mires, ravines and mountain summits.

Cultivation 
The plant's primary habitats are in marshes, wetlands, and loamy/sandy soils. It prefers low pH, acidic soils and will not fruit or grow well in basic conditions. The ideal conditions for this plant are in full sun; it can handle partial-sun though it may fruit less. The harvest season of the edible fruit of the Vaccinium formosum is primarily late spring/summer.

Further reading 
Wiersema, J. H., León, B. (1999). World Economic Plants: A Standard Reference. United States: CRC-Press. 

Hancock, J. F., Retamales, J. B. (2018). Blueberries. United Kingdom: CABI.

References 

formosum
Blueberries
Flora of the Southeastern United States
Fruits originating in North America
Flora without expected TNC conservation status